Stonydelph is a neighbourhood about  south east of the centre of Tamworth, Staffordshire.

A spelling of "Stoneydelph" is sometimes used but the OS map of 1888 shows "Stonydelph Farm" as the only building in this area. Much of the area is based around a road named "Pennine Way".

One of the education providers in the area is Three Peaks Primary Academy which was rated as "Good" by Ofsted in September 2017. Three Peaks Primary Academy is part of Creative Education Trust which is a charity and multi-academy trust. The second education provider in the area is Stonydelph Primary School located on Crowden road.

A local centre is located on Ellerbeck road which contains almost all of Stonydelph's facilities that serve the area. These include: Spar supermarket, Subway (located in the supermarket), post office (located in the supermarket), church (St Martins in the Delph), pharmacy, hairdressers, Mccolls newsagents, Stonydelph Fish and Chips shop, dentist, Stonydelph health centre, Blacksmith Arms pub.
The site can be accessed by the Ellerbeck road/s which allow access to the north and south of the site. There are many parking spaces in and around the area.
Other facilities in the area include: Crossfell general stores, newsagents on Pennymoor road, youth club on Pennymoor road, Tamworth wellbeing and cancer support centre on Craven road.

References

Villages in Staffordshire
Areas of Tamworth, Staffordshire